WKA is a three-letter acronym that may refer to:

World Kickboxing Association (WKA)
World Karting Association
Wānaka Airport, New Zealand
United States v. Wong Kim Ark, a U.S. Supreme Court case concerning citizenship
Witch-King of Angmar, a character from the works of J.R.R. Tolkien